Jovan Anthony Malcolm (born 10 December 2002) is an English professional footballer who plays as a forward for West Bromwich Albion.

Career
Malcolm began his career with West Bromwich Albion, and in 2019 was linked with a transfer away from the club. He signed a new three-year contract with the club in July 2021. He moved on loan to Accrington Stanley in August 2021. He had also been linked with a move to Shrewsbury Town. He made his Accrington debut on 4 September, appearing as a substitute alongside Ethan Hamilton, also making his debut. The loan was terminated in January 2022 after Malcolm was recalled by West Bromwich Albion.

On 11 February 2022, Malcolm joined National League side Solihull Moors on a one-month loan deal. He made his Solihull debut a few days later, in the FA Trophy.

He scored his first goal for West Brom on 17 January 2023, appearing as a substitute in a FA Cup match.

Career statistics

Honours 
West Bromwich Albion U23

 Premier League Cup winner: 2021–22

References

2002 births
Living people
English footballers
West Bromwich Albion F.C. players
Accrington Stanley F.C. players
Solihull Moors F.C. players
English Football League players
Association football forwards
National League (English football) players